Sharon is a city in Taliaferro County, Georgia, United States. The population was 105 at the 2000 census.

History
The community of Sharon is visible on maps as early as 1865.  The Georgia General Assembly incorporated Sharon as a town in 1884. The community is named after the Plain of Sharon, a place mentioned in the Hebrew Bible.

Into the 1890s, Sharon was bustling with thousands of travelers who came there for the reputed healing powers of the nearby Electric Health Resort, where it was said that exposure to bedrock in a subterranean chamber provided electrical healing powers. The resort, which included a hotel, lake, and post office, eventually burned down.

Geography
Sharon is located at  (33.558724, -82.793784).

Demographics

As of the census of 2000, there were 105 people, 46 households, and 28 families residing in the city. The racial makeup of the city was 27.62% White, 71.43% African American and 0.95% Asian.

There were 46 households, out of which 17.4% had children under the age of 18 living with them, 43.5% were married couples living together, 15.2% had a female householder with no husband present, and 37.0% were non-families. 32.6% of all households were made up of individuals, and 13.0% had someone living alone who was 65 years of age or older. The average household size was 2.28 and the average family size was 2.86.

In the city, the population was spread out, with 15.2% under the age of 18, 9.5% from 18 to 24, 22.9% from 25 to 44, 37.1% from 45 to 64, and 15.2% who were 65 years of age or older. The median age was 46 years. For every 100 females, there were 133.3 males. For every 100 females age 18 and over, there were 128.2 males.

The median income for a household in the city was $19,167, and the median income for a family was $17,500. Males had a median income of $24,375 versus $12,083 for females. The per capita income for the city was $10,519. There were 23.5% of families and 31.8% of the population living below the poverty line, including 65.0% of under eighteens and 41.2% of those over 64.

Notable person
Lloyd D. Brown, United States Army Major General who commanded 28th Infantry Division in World War II

See also

Central Savannah River Area

References

External links
 Sharon, Georgia in Wikimapia

Cities in Georgia (U.S. state)
Cities in Taliaferro County, Georgia